Chillicothe is a city in the state of Missouri and the county seat of Livingston County, Missouri, United States. The population was 9,107 at the 2020 census.  The name "Chillicothe" is Shawnee for "big town", and was named after their principal town Chillicothe, located since 1774 about a mile from the present-day city of Chillicothe, Ohio.

History of Chillicothe and Livingston County

This territory was originally settled by indigenous peoples of the Americas. The Osage and Missouri were in the territory at the time of earliest European contact, which was mostly by French explorers and traders. By 1800 the Shawnee and Iowa had migrated here. The Shawnee came from the Ohio Country, where they had been under pressure before the American Revolution from aggressive Iroquois and later encroaching European Americans. Displacing the Osage, the Shawnee had a major village known as Chillicothe about a mile from the present-day city, named after their historic capital in their traditional lands in Ohio. Chillicothe was also the name of a major band of the tribe. Other Native American tribes in the area were the Sac and Fox, and Pottawatomi, all of whom hunted in the area.
  
In the early 19th century, European-American migration to Missouri increased. The original survey of Chillicothe by United States citizens was filed for record August 31, 1837, and a resurvey of the same was filed August 5, 1859. Chillicothe was incorporated as a city by an act of the General Assembly, approved March 1, 1855. It was selected as the County seat by commissioners and the first term of the county court began on May 7, 1838. In August of that year an order was made to erect the first Court House, the cost not to exceed $5,000, in the Public Square; The first circuit court for the trial of civil and criminal causes was held on the 3d of July 1887.

Livingston was settled by emigrants from the older counties and others from the Upper South states of Kentucky and Tennessee, as well as Ohio and other "Old Northwest" states, as the westward migration continued. Prior to completion of the Hannibal & St. Joseph Railroad in 1859, the city was minimally developed with cheap frame houses, with little pretense of architectural beauty or design. The building materials being hewed and sawed from the oak and walnut timber surrounding the town, as timber originally covered the site.
 
The railroad gave an impetus for town improvements. Soon two and three-story brick business buildings were constructed in place of the former frame structures. From 1865 to 1870, the city improved rapidly, then a lull lasted until 1875, when the erection of the beautiful three-story, $36,000 school building was started, now known as "Middle School." From that time on Chillicothe made a slow, steady growth up to 1886, when the Chicago, Milwaukee & St. Paul Railroad was built through here. That year also saw the introduction of the "Water Works" and electric lights. The city continued to modernize in the early 20th century.

The Missouri Training School for Girls
The Missouri Training School for Girls (1889-1981) was the correctional facility of the Missouri Division of Youth Services. It opened in 1889. In 1956, the school received all of the black girls after the Missouri Training School for Negro Girls in Tipton closed. The school closed in 1981.

Geography
Chillicothe is located in central Livingston County. The Grand River flows past approximately one mile south of the city and the confluence of the Thompson River with the Grand is about three miles to the southwest. The city is served by U.S. Route 36, U.S. Route 65 and Missouri Route 190.

Climate

Demographics

2010 census
As of the census of 2010, there were 9,515 people, 3,612 households, and 2,146 families living in the city. The racial makeup of the city was 93.5% White, 3.7% African American, 0.4% Native American, 0.3% Asian, 0.5% from other races, and 1.5% from two or more races. Hispanic or Latino of any race were 1.5% of the population.

There were 3,612 households, of which 29.7% had children under the age of 18 living with them, 42.6% were married couples living together, 12.7% had a female householder with no husband present, 4.1% had a male householder with no wife present, and 40.6% were non-families. 35.5% of all households were made up of individuals, and 17.2% had someone living alone who was 65 years of age or older. The average household size was 2.26 and the average family size was 2.90.

The median age in the city was 39.6 years. 21.4% of residents were under the age of 18; 8.3% were between the ages of 18 and 24; 27.3% were from 25 to 44; 24.3% were from 45 to 64; and 18.6% were 65 years of age or older. The gender makeup of the city was 41.3% male and 58.7% female.

2000 census
As of the census of 2000, there were 8,968 people, 3,608 households, and 2,197 families living in the city. The population density was 1,370.9 people per square mile (529.4/km2). There were 4,060 housing units at an average density of 620.7/sq mi (239.7/km2). The racial makeup of the city was 93.86% White, 3.69% African American, 0.41% Native American, 0.40% Asian, 0.35% from other races, and 1.29% from two or more races. Hispanic or Latino of any race were 0.96% of the population.

There were 3,608 households, out of which 28.7% had children under the age of 18 living with them, 47.1% were married couples living together, 10.4% had a female householder with no husband present, and 39.1% were non-families. 35.9% of all households were made up of individuals, and 18.9% had someone living alone who was 65 years of age or older. school districts.
The average household size was 2.24 and the average family size was 2.92.

In the city the population was spread out, with 23.2% under the age of 18, 7.7% from 18 to 24, 27.1% from 25 to 44, 20.9% from 45 to 64, and 21.1% who were 65 years of age or older. The median age was 40 years. For every 100 females, there were 75.9 males. For every 100 females age 18 and over, there were 68.4 males.

The median income for a household in the city was $30,053, and the median income for a family was $40,163. Males had a median income of $29,070 versus $19,745 for females. The per capita income for the city was $16,172. About 9.6% of families and 13.4% of the population were below the poverty line, including 17.1% of those under age 18 and 13.0% of those age 65 or over.

Education
The Chillicothe R-II School District provides preschool through 12th grade education as well as some other educational programs to students in and around Chillicothe.

PK-12th grade
 Chillicothe High School (9th-12th grade)
 Chillicothe Alternative School (9th-12th grade)
 Chillicothe Middle School (6th-8th grade)
Dewey Elementary School (4th-5th grade)
 Field Elementary School (2nd-3rd grade)
 Chillicothe Elementary School (Pre-K-1st)

Other programs and campuses
 Garrison School - headquarters for Title I Preschool, Even Start Family Literacy, Parents as Teachers, adult GED classes, and Early Intervention Assistance
 Grand River Technical School
 Litton Agri-Science Learning Center

Private schools
 Bishop Hogan Memorial School (PK-8), operated by St. Columban Catholic Church, Chillicothe

Public library
The town has a lending library, the Livingston County Library.
The town has a children library, the Lillian DesMarias Youth Library.

Media
Chillicothe Constitution-Tribune, established in 1889
 KCHI Radio- KCHI-AM transmission on 1010 kHz and KCHI-FM on 102.5 MHz.
 KRNW Radio (88.9-an FM repeater station which co-broadcasts Northwest MO State University's flagship station KXCV's programming-NPR affiliated)
 KULH Radio (105.9 The Wave) Christian Radio station

In popular culture

 Chillicothe is known as "The Home of Sliced Bread". On July 7, 1928, the Chillicothe Baking Company began selling pre-sliced bread "at quality grocers in the area", marking the first time sliced bread was available commercially in the world.  They used the Rohwedder Bread Slicer, a machine created by Iowa inventor, Otto Frederick Rohwedder.

Notable people

 Moses Alexander, 11th governor of Idaho
 Bower Slack Broaddus, judge
 Courtney W. Campbell, congressman
 Ray and Faye Copeland, serial killers
 William Lincoln Garver, architect, author, and socialist politician
 Claude B. Hutchison, botanist and politician
 Mike Lair, politician and teacher
 Jerry Litton, congressman
 Charles H. Mansur, congressman
 Shirley Collie Nelson, country music artist/actress
 Henry Moses Pollard, congressman
 John Quinn, politician
 William Y. Slack, Civil War general and politician
 Clarence Edwin Watkins, publisher

References

External links

 City of Chillicothe, Missouri, Official Website
  "Livingston County History", Livingston County Library
 Grand River Historical Society Museum, Official Website
 Chillicothe, Missouri profile
 Historic maps of Chillicothe in the Sanborn Maps of Missouri Collection at the University of Missouri

 
Cities in Missouri
Cities in Livingston County, Missouri
County seats in Missouri
Populated places established in 1855
1855 establishments in Missouri